Admetus was a Macedonian commander of the agema of the hypaspists, a man of great bodily strength. He was killed in the Siege of Tyre (332 BC).

References
 Waldemar Heckel,Who's Who in the Age of Alexander the Great 

Generals of Alexander the Great
Ancient Greek generals
Ancient Macedonian generals
Ancient Macedonians killed in battle
4th-century BC Macedonians